Lassiter (also known as The Magnificent Thief) is a 1984 American heist spy film starring Tom Selleck and Jane Seymour. The movie was made to cash in on Selleck's popularity as the character Thomas Magnum in the television show Magnum, P.I., but it failed to return its budget at the box-office on release. The Magnum, P.I. connection is perhaps most clearly seen by the movie poster tagline: The Magnum Man Hits the Big Screen with a Vengeance.

Plot

Nick Lassiter (Tom Selleck) is a gentleman jewel thief in 1939 London, England. He is arrested by the police after breaking into a London mansion and, after being a member of a phony lineup in which he is positively identified by a law enforcement plant, British law enforcement and the FBI blackmail Lassiter to break into the German Embassy and steal $10 million in Nazi diamonds from a German spy (Lauren Hutton), but first he must locate their hiding place. The gems are en route to South America and will be sold to help finance Hitler's military buildup. The authorities want the Nazi diamonds and to put Lassiter away for good, but he has other plans, and a surprise twist ending changes everything.

Cast
 Tom Selleck as Nick Lassiter
 Jane Seymour as Sara Wells
 Lauren Hutton as Kari Von Fursten
 Bob Hoskins as Inspector John Becker
 Joe Regalbuto as Peter Breeze
 Ed Lauter as "Smoke"
 Warren Clarke as Max Hofer
 Edward Peel as Sergeant Allyce
 Christopher Malcolm as Quaid
 Peter Skellern as The Pianist
 Harry Towb as Roger Boardman
 Belinda Mayne as Helen Boardman
 W. Morgan Sheppard as Sweeny
 Brian Coburn as Burto Gunz
 David Warbeck as Muller
 Nicholas Bond-Owen as Freddie

Production
The film was Selleck's second starring vehicle after becoming an international name with Magnum. He optioned the script himself, showed it to Golden Harvest while making High Road to China and they bought the option.

Selleck signed to make Lassiter before High Road to China came out "because I thought it was a good idea to have another film lined up in case High Road didn't work." The film would be directed by Roger Young, who directed the pilot for Magnum, and the filmmakers agreed to work around Selleck's limited schedule - he could only film between April and June.

"If I'd planned things out maybe I wouldn't have picked two period films in a row," he said. "But this was by far the best thing that came along. I hope I fit into it. I like the clothes and the hook."

Selleck admitted shortly before filming that he was having second thoughts about making the movie. Advance word on High Road was strong and he was offered a number of other movies. However he stuck to his original promise.

Selleck said "in a business where you often hear actors described as children its nice to be treated as a partner and as an equal. I was able to have a lot of input into the script, although it didn't need that much."

"Nick Lassiter is a little rougher around the edges than Magnum," said Selleck. "He's a very self assured character. He should be able to walk into a movie with a certain amount of arrogance and gall."

Reception
Lassiter grossed over $17.5 million at the box office against a $20 million budget, making this a commercial failure.

The film received mixed reviews from critics. Lassiter currently holds a 53% rating on Rotten Tomatoes based on 15 reviews.

References

External links

 
Review New York Times Review
Review Variety Magazine
Review by Roger Ebert

1984 films
1980s crime thriller films
1980s heist films
1980s spy films
American crime thriller films
American heist films
American spy films
Films set in 1939
Films set in London
Films directed by Roger Young
Warner Bros. films
1984 directorial debut films
Films scored by Ken Thorne
1980s English-language films
1980s American films